David la Touche Colthurst (1828 – 19 January 1907) was an Irish Home Rule League politician. He was elected Home Rule Member of Parliament (MP) for County Cork at the 1879 by-election, and remained MP until the seat was abolished in 1885.

References

External links
 

UK MPs 1874–1880
UK MPs 1880–1885
1828 births
1907 deaths
Home Rule League MPs
Members of the Parliament of the United Kingdom for County Cork constituencies (1801–1922)